Samuel Alschuler (November 20, 1859 – November 9, 1939) was a United States circuit judge of the United States Court of Appeals for the Seventh Circuit.

Education and career
Born in Chicago, Illinois, Alschuler read law in 1881. He was in private practice in Aurora, Illinois from 1881 to 1901 and continued in private practice in Chicago until 1915. He was also a member of the Illinois House of Representatives from 1896 to 1900 and was a Democrat.

Federal judicial service
Alschuler received a recess appointment from President Woodrow Wilson on August 16, 1915, to a seat on the United States Court of Appeals for the Seventh Circuit vacated by Judge Peter S. Grosscup. He was nominated to the same position by President Wilson on January 7, 1916. He was confirmed by the United States Senate on January 18, 1916, and received his commission the same day. He was a member of the Conference of Senior Circuit Judges (now the Judicial Conference of the United States) from 1924 to 1934. He assumed senior status on May 15, 1936. His service terminated on November 9, 1939, due to his death.

Other service
Alschuler was appointed to arbitrate between meatpacking unions in Chicago and employers after the President's Mediation Commission intervened in November 1917. From 1922 to 1923, Alschuler served on the new Federal Coal Commission.

Family
His brother George W. Alschuler also served in the Illinois House of Representatives.

See also
 Federal Coal Commission

References

Sources

External links

1859 births
1939 deaths
Democratic Party members of the Illinois House of Representatives
Judges of the United States Court of Appeals for the Seventh Circuit
United States court of appeals judges appointed by Woodrow Wilson
20th-century American judges
People from Aurora, Illinois
Lawyers from Chicago
United States federal judges admitted to the practice of law by reading law